The Weekly Observer is a Ugandan weekly newspaper headquartered in Kamwookya, Kampala.  It is one of the largest privately owned papers in the country co-founded by maverick journalist John Kevin Aliro and nine other directors In 2007, its reporter Richard M Kavuma won the CNN Multichoice African Journalist of the Year award. The newspaper was founded in 2004 and celebrated 10 years of existence in March 2014. Tom kiss of jamila

See also 
 List of newspapers in Uganda
 Media in Uganda

References

External links 
 
 ACME https://acme-ug.org/2018/07/04/i-gave-observer-what-i-could-now-its-time-to-move-on-james-tumusiime/
 UNESCO https://unesdoc.unesco.org/ark:/48223/pf0000265542

Weekly newspapers published in Uganda
Mass media in Kampala
Companies based in Kampala

de:The Weekly Observer